On 18 April 2019, gunmen massacred several passengers travelling from Karachi to Gwadar in Makran, Balochistan, Pakistan. An estimated 15 to 20 armed militants stopped around five or six buses between 12:30am and 1am on a Makran Coastal Road. After the buses halted the gunmen then inspected the identity papers of the passengers and had about 16 of them disembark. At least 14 were shot dead, while two passengers managed to escape from the gunmen and travelled to the closest Balochistan Levies checkpost. They were later transported to Ormara Hospital for treatment.
Law enforcement and Levies personnel arrived at the scene shortly afterward and commenced an investigation into the attack. The victims' bodies were taken from the Noor Baksh Hotel.

Responsibility  
The Baloch Raaji Aajoi Sangar (BRAS), An alliance of ethnic Baloch militant armed groups has taken responsibility for the massacre in an email statement.
"... those who were targeted carried [identification] cards of the Pakistan Navy and Coast Guards, and they were only killed after they were identified." Raaji Aajoi Sangar, the spokesperson for the Baloch, said in the statement.

Reaction 
Zia Langove, the Home Minister said that a full-scale investigation will be carried out into the attack and that the perpetrators would be tracked down. "Such incidents are intolerable and we will not spare the terrorists who carried out this dastardly attack," he said.

Jam Kamal, the Chief Minister of Balochistan, denounced the attacks and extended his condolences to the families of the victims. "These cowardly terrorists showed the extent of their barbarism by murdering innocent passengers," the chief minister said. He labelled the attack as an effort to stimy progress in Balochistan, and said that "progress will continue no matter what, The people of Balochistan look upon terrorists who follow the agenda of foreign elements with hate, through the support of the people, terrorism will be eliminated and the terrorists will continue to be brought to justice."

The Prime Minister of Pakistan, Imran Khan, also condemned the attack in a statement. Khan want a swift investigation into the incident has directed the authorities to make every possible effort to identify and bring the perpetrators to justice. He also expressed his sympathies with the families of the victims.

References 

21st-century mass murder in Pakistan
Makran massacre
2019 mass shootings in Asia
April 2019 crimes in Asia
Makran massacre
Mass murder in Balochistan, Pakistan
Mass shootings in Pakistan
Terrorist incidents in Balochistan, Pakistan
Makran massacre
Deaths by firearm in Balochistan, Pakistan
Terrorist incidents on buses in Asia